The State Historic Preservation Office (SHPO) is a state governmental function created by the United States federal government in 1966 under Section 101 of the National Historic Preservation Act (NHPA). The purposes of a SHPO include surveying and recognizing historic properties, reviewing nominations for properties to be included in the National Register of Historic Places, reviewing undertakings for the impact on the properties as well as supporting federal organizations, state and local governments, and private sector. States are responsible for setting up their own SHPO; therefore, each SHPO varies slightly on rules and regulations. To link these differences with the SHPOs, the National Conference of State Historic Preservation Officers (NCSHPO) was created as a “point of contact” according to the National Historic Preservation Act.

History
In 1966, the National Historic Preservation Act (NHPA) was put into effect. As part of the Congressional Act, Section 101 implemented the designation of the State Historic Preservation Program. State Liaison Officers, which later became known as State Historic Preservation Officers, were established to manage historic preservation grants for the National Park Service (NPS). In the 1970s, these SHPOs experienced a growth in power as they became more organized, efficient and professional, and clarified their relationships with NPS. 

They also formed a National Conference of State Historic Preservation Officers to represent them on a National level, particularly in Washington. The SHPO continued to gain an increasingly specific role, taking on the position of the advising consultant for the Section 106 review process. In 1980 with the amendment to the NHPA, the SHPO's exact duties were finally identified, defining its role, which remains today.

Purposes
The responsibilities of the State Historic Preservation Office, according to the National Historic Preservation Act of 1966, as amended, include running the State Historic Preservation Program and, as stated in the Act:

Definitions
“Comprehensive Statewide Historic preservation plan” – The official plan assumed by local governments throughout the state, that guides decision making over proposed public and private actions affecting community development. View an example here.

“Secretary” refers to the Secretary of the Interior in the Department of the Interior.

"Historic Preservation Program" – A program designed to support and promote historic preservation interests and priorities. There are National, Federal and State Preservation Programs, each tailored to suit the needs at each particular level.

“Certified local government”- For a city or town's local government to become certified, it has to meet particular standards so that it can participate in certain NHPA programs.

SHPO among states
SHPOs exist not only in 50 states, but also in the District of Columbia, Puerto Rico, American Samoa, the Virgin Islands, Guam, the Commonwealth of the Northern Mariana Islands, the Republic of Palau, the Republic of Marshall Islands, and the Federated States of Micronesia; making 59 SHPOs total. Each State Historic Preservation Office is responsible for effective planning to address preservation matters. For example, agricultural structures such as barns are significant to New Hampshire’s “values of heritage, hard work, productivity and stewardship” and the state has devoted special programs to help preserve these values. 

In Florida, Art Deco buildings in South Beach are considered significant to the state. As a result of these differences, states have expanded and/or specialized their SHPO purposes and created private organizations.  Alaska's Coastal Management Program is a private organization, created by the state to regulate agencies to acknowledge environmental and cultural resources within the Alaskan Coast and protect them.

THPO
Tribal Historic Preservation Officers (THPOs) assume "some or all of the functions of State Historic Preservation Officers on Tribal lands."

NCSHPO
The National Conference of State Historic Preservation Officers (NCSHPO) is a non-profit organization for State Historic Preservation Officers (SHPO). It serves as a way of contacting the SHPOs as well as a way for the SHPOs to communicate with each other. The mission of the NCSHPO is to act as a national representative for the SHPOs, especially when it comes to representing their interests in Washington.

The NCSHPO meets once a year and participants include not only SHPOs, but members of Preservation Action and the National Alliance of Preservation Commissions, National Trust for Historic Preservation Advisors and federal agencies. Participants are updated on important legislative issues and then visit Capitol Hill with the information, to meet with their Representatives and Senators to establish favorable positions on these issues.

Generally the President of the NCSHPO is a previous member of the Advisory Council on Historic Preservation (ACHP) while the Board of Directors, which governs NCSHPO, is elected by the member states and meets more frequently than once a year. It acts as a representative for them with federal agencies and national preservation organizations. It is important to have a close relationship with these federal agencies and national organizations, and NCSHPO maintains these by partnering closely with organizations such as: The ACHP, The National Park Service, The National Trust for Historic Preservation and Preservation Action.

See also
Save America's Treasures
Tribal Historic Preservation Officer

Notes and references

External links 
 NCSHPO directory

Government agencies established in 1966
Historic preservation in the United States
National Register of Historic Places
 
1966 establishments in the United States